The Orick Peanut is a wooden sculpture located in the parking lot of the Shoreline Deli and Market on the south side of the town of Orick located in Humboldt County, California. It was created as part of a protest against the expansion of Redwood National Park (later Redwood National and State Parks) in 1978. It is estimated to weigh 9 tons and is approximately 10 feet long and 6 feet tall.

Creation 
The Peanut was created by a group of people, including a man named Glen Schirmann. It was carved with chainsaws from a large piece of old growth redwood. It is estimated to weigh 9 tons.

The peanut shape is related to the fact that Jimmy Carter, the president at the time, was known as a former peanut farmer. The Orick Peanut was made as a mock gift for Jimmy Carter as part of a protest against his proposed expansion of the Redwood National Park, which was seen as an overstepping of federal power, a waste of money, and a move that would negatively impact the Redwood logging industry based communities in Humboldt County, like Orick.

Travels to Washington D.C. 
The Orick Peanut, loaded onto a tractor trailer, led a procession of logging trucks from Humboldt County across the United States to Washington DC. The Peanut was presented to President Jimmy Carter as a mock present, along with an attached sign that read "It might be Peanuts to you, But it's Jobs to Us". The President's aides turned the Peanut away, and it was driven back, with the procession, back to Orick, where it resides today.

See also 
"Enough is Enough" Documentary created by the Associated California Loggers, 1977

References

Sculptures in California
Wooden sculptures in the United States
1978 in California
Buildings and structures in Humboldt County, California